The 1980–81 Yorkshire Football League was the 55th season in the history of the Yorkshire Football League, a football competition in England.

Division One

Division One featured 12 clubs which competed in the previous season, along with four new clubs, promoted from Division Two:
Barton Town
Bentley Victoria Welfare
Kiveton Park
Maltby Miners Welfare

League table

Map

Division Two

Division Two featured eight clubs which competed in the previous season, along with eight new clubs.
Clubs relegated from Division One:
Fryston Colliery Welfare
Ossett Albion
Ossett Town
Thorne Colliery
Clubs promoted from Division Three:
Garforth Miners
Hall Road Rangers
Pilkington Recreation
Rawmarsh Welfare

League table

Map

Division Three

Division Three featured nine clubs which competed in the previous season, along with seven new clubs.
Clubs relegated from Division Two:
Brook Sports
Denaby United
Stocksbridge Works
Tadcaster Albion
Plus:
Bradley Rangers, joined from the West Yorkshire League
Grimethorpe Miners Welfare, joined from Doncaster & District Senior League
Harrogate Railway Athletic, joined from Harrogate & District League

Also, Sheffield Water Works changed name to Yorkshire Water Authority (Southern).

League table

Map

League Cup

Final

References

Yorkshire Football League
8